The Clock is a 30-minute American anthology television series based upon the American Broadcasting Company radio series, which ran from 1946–48. The half-hour series mostly consisted of original dramas concerning murder, mayhem or insanity. Series narrator Larry Semon was the only regular; each week a new set of guest stars were featured. The title of the series was derived from a clock which was a major plot element in each story. The show's musical theme was "The Sands of Time". Ninety-one episodes aired from 1949 to 1952, most of them on NBC, except for the final season which aired on ABC.

Among its directors were Fred Coe, one of the pioneering producers in the Golden Age of Television.

Notable guest stars included Grace Kelly, Eva Marie Saint, Charlton Heston, Cloris Leachman, Raymond Massey, Jackie Cooper, Leslie Nielsen, Robert Sterling, George Reeves, Jack Albertson, Anna Lee.

External links
The Clock (TV series) at CVTA with episode list

1940s American anthology television series
1950s American anthology television series
1949 American television series debuts
1952 American television series endings
American Broadcasting Company original programming
NBC original programming
Black-and-white American television shows